Brad Graham (born 1 September 2001) is an English professional rugby league footballer who plays as a  or a er for the Dewsbury Rams in the RFL Championship.

Career 
England Youth International touring France in July 2018.

Castleford Tigers
In 2020 he made his Super League début for Castleford Tigers (Heritage № 1001) against Hull FC.

In June 2021 he made his second Super League appearance for Castleford Tigers against Catalan Dragons.

In August 2021 he made his third Super League appearance for Castleford Tigers against Huddersfield Giants. He also scored his first Super League try.

Dewsbury Rams
On 19 Nov 2021 it was reported that he had signed for Dewsbury Rams in the RFL Championship.

On 7 Feb 2022 made Dewsbury Rams debut v York City Knights.

On 13 Feb 2022 he made his second Championship appearance for Dewsbury Rams v Sheffield Eagles scoring his first try in a 12- 10 Dewsbury victory.

On 20 March 2022 he made his fifth Championship appearance for Dewsbury Rams v Newcastle Thunder scoring his second try in a 22-24 defeat.

On 3 July 2022 he made his ninth Championship appearance for Dewsbury Rams v Halifax Panthers playing in the right second row position. Rams lost 12-38.

On 10 July 2022 he made his tenth Championship appearance for Dewsbury Rams v Widnes Vikings playing in the left centre position. He scored a try in a 16-20 defeat for the Rams.

On 21 Aug 2022 he made his sixteenth Championship appearance for Dewsbury Rams v Workington playing in the right second row position. Rams won 26-20.

Sept 2022 he signed a one year deal to remain at the Rams during their League 1 campaign in 2023.

On 19 Feb 2023 he made his 1st appearance in League One for Dewsbury Rams v North Wales Crusaders playing in the left second row position. He scored a try in a 38 - 18 win for the Rams.

On 25 Feb 2023 he made his first appearance in the challenge cup for Dewsbury Rams v Ashton Bears(Wigan) playing in the left second row position. The Rams won 38 - 8.

On 12 March 2023 he made his second appearance in the challenge cup for Dewsbury Rams v Rochdale Hornets playing in the left second row position. The Rams won 38 - 18 and he scored his first professional hat trick.

References

External links
Castleford Tigers profile

2001 births
Living people
Castleford Tigers players
Dewsbury Rams players
English rugby league players
Rugby league centres
Rugby league wingers